The Pattern of Painful Adventures (1576) is a prose novel. A later edition, printed in 1607 by Valentine Simmes and published by Nathaniel Butter, was drawn on by William Shakespeare for his play Pericles, Prince of Tyre. There was at least one intermediate edition, around 1595.

It was a translation by Lawrence Twine of the tale of Apollonius of Tyre from John Gower's Confessio Amantis (in Middle English verse). It is also said to be translated from a French version. William Henry Schofield stated that Shakespeare used both sources.

Notes

External links
British Library - Shakespeare Quartos

William Shakespeare
1576 novels
1607 novels